Vicente Hermosa Garces, also known as Vicente Garces and Nyor Inting, was a Filipino Visayan politician, writer, and poet. His famous written works in Cebuano were published in Visayan newspaper, Bag-ong Kusog. He also served as mayor in the then municipality of Talisay, Cebu, Philippines from 1925 to 1937.

Early life and education 
Vicente H. Garces was to parents Agapito Garces and Teodora Hermosa born on December 18, 1887. The family used to reside in the district of Parian, Cebu City. He attended school at the Colegio de San Carlos, and then proceeded to take a law degree at the Lyceum de Manila.

At age 18, he married Resureccion Bangoy who was fondly called Lola Eccion and bore 13 children namely Alfreda, Agapito, Asteria, Clarita, Jesusa, Jose, Mariano, Pilar, Resureccion, Sincletica, Teodora, Vicente, and Virginio. Upon his marriage, he settled in Talisay, Cebu with his wife and children. The Garces Ancestral house is still extant on Jose Rizal Street in Talisay. The house was built in 1955 and was one of the tallest structures in the Poblacion.

Literary career 
Garces wrote for the Vicente Rama-owned Visayan newspaper, Bag-ong Kusog, using the pseudonyms Garvi and Kampisaw, after the name of a bird. His earliest published works included Kaniya Gibuhat ang Iyang Nabuhat (To Whom it was Done What's Done), Mahinuklogogng Paglubong ni Alicia (The Sorrowful Burial of Alice), and May Katarongan kang Imo Akong Hikalimtan (You Have Reason To Forget Me). He was regarded as one of the pioneers in Cebuano short story genre and his story, Mahinuklogogng Paglubong ni Alicia (The Sorrowful Burial of Alice), is considered part of the regional literary canon.

He organized Dilang Bisaya (DILBIS), a literary group established 1963, and became its first president.

Political career 
Garces was the local leader in Talisay of the political party, Partido Democrata. The party included Vicente Rama and Vicente Sotto, both of whom were his colleagues in journalism. In 1925, he ran in the election and won as mayor in the then municipality of Talisay. He served from 1925 to 1931. On September 5, 1971, he died at the age of 83.

Historical commemoration 
 Garces was named as one of the pre-war Cebuano writers in the short story genre by the National Library of the Philippines.
The Cebu provincial government cited his published work, Mahinuklugong Paglubong ni Alicia, as one of the notable works in the Cebuano literary canon.
The Cebuano Studies Center of the University of San Carlos included him in the list of pre-World War II published Cebuano authors.
 Vicente H. Garces Street was named after him. Located in Barangay Poblacion, it is one of the major thoroughfares in Talisay City, passing through Talisay City College (formerly the municipal hall) and the parish church, Archdiocesan Shrine of St. Therese of Avila.

See also 
 Cebuano literature
Bag-ong Kusog
Vicente Rama

External links 
Vicente Garces on Cebuano Studies Center

References 

1887 births
1971 deaths
Filipino writers by province
Filipino writers' organizations
Filipino writers by century
Cebuano people
Visayan people
University of San Carlos alumni
Writers from Cebu
20th-century Filipino writers
Cebuano literature
Cebuano language
Cebuano writers
Filipino poets
Filipino short story writers
Mayors of Talisay, Cebu